The Estonian Men's Curling Championship is the national championship of men's curling teams in Estonia. It has been held annually since the 2004–2005 season, and is organized by the Estonian Curling Association.

List of champions and medallists
Team line-ups shows in order: fourth, third, second, lead, alternate (if exists), coach (if exists); skips marked bold.
{|class="wikitable"
! Year
! Dates
! Champion
! Runner-up
! Bronze
|-
|align=center|2005
|align=center| –
| "Puhastusimport":Martin Lill, Siim Sildnik, Toomas Lill, Harri Lill, alternates: Erkki Lill, Jan Anderson
| "Jeti II":Vladimir Jakovlev, Maile Mölder, Konstantin Dotsenko, Aleksei Dobrõšman, alternate: Aleksei Dikun
| "Rekrea":Jaanus Lindre, Silver Uustalu, Kuldar Nurmik, Marek Lindmaa
|-
|align=center|2006
|align=center| ... – April 1Tallinn
| "Jeti":Vladimir Jakovlev, Konstantin Dotsenko, Aleksei Dikun, Jevgeni Aksenovski
| "Hansa Sport":Leo Jakobson, Andres Jakobson, Jüri Rõuk, Sven Petermann
| "Puhastusimport":Martin Lill, Ingar Mäesalu, Erkki Lill, Toomas Lill, alternate: Jan Anderson
|-
|align=center|2007
|align=center| ... – March 1Tallinn
| "Puhastusimport":Martin Lill, Toomas Lill, Siim Sildnik, Jan Anderson, alternate: Karl Kukner, Ingar Mäesalu
| "Arenaria":Erkki Lill, Tanel Telliskivi, Harri Lill, Jaanus Lindre, alternate: Rauno Peebo
| "Jeti":Vladimir Jakovlev, Konstantin Dotsenko, Aleksei Dikun, Jevgeni Aksenovski
|-
|align=center|2008
|align=center|March ...–31Tallinn
| "Arenaria":Erkki Lill, Tanel Telliskivi, Harri Lill, Jaanus Lindre, alternate: Rauno Peebo
| "Puhastusimport":Martin Lill, Ingar Mäesalu, Karl Kukner, Jan Anderson, alternates: Siim Sildnik, Toomas Lill
| "Jeti":Vladimir Jakovlev, Konstantin Dotsenko, Aleksei Dikun, Jevgeni Aksenovski
|-
|align=center|2009
|align=center|March ...–3Tallinn
| "Arenaria":Erkki Lill, Harri Lill, Jaanus Lindre, Rauno Peebo, alternates: Tanel Telliskivi, Tanel Koll
| "Puhastusimport":Martin Lill, Ingar Mäesalu, Siim Sildnik, Jan Anderson, alternates: Karl Kukner, Toomas Lill
| "Bullseye":Vladimir Jakovlev, Mihhail Vlassov, Janis Kiziridi, Aleksandr Vaganov, alternate: Eduard Veltsman
|-
|align=center|2010
|align=center|January 15 – February 20Tallinn
| "Arenaria":Erkki Lill, Harri Lill, Jaanus Lindre, Toomas Lill, alternate: Tanel Telliskivi, coach: Maile Mölder
| "Jeti":Vladimir Jakovlev, Aleksandr Orlov, Jevgeni Aksenovski, Aleksei Dikun, alternates: Anton Porotikov, Pavel Kolobuhhov
| "Puhastusimport":Martin Lill, Ingar Mäesalu, Siim Sildnik, Jan Anderson, alternate: Karl Kukner, coach: Kristiine Lill|-
|align=center|2011
|align=center|January 28 – March 13Tallinn
| "Arenaria":Harri Lill, Erkki Lill, Jaanus Lindre, Tanel Telliskivi, alternate: Tanel Koll
| "Cleanfix / Puhastusimport":Martin Lill, Siim Sildnik, Ingar Mäesalu, Jan Anderson, alternate: Karl Kukner
| "Bullseye":Vladimir Jakovlev, Eduard Veltsman, Eduard Jakovlev, Mihhail Vlassov, alternate: Janis Kiziridi
|-
|align=center|2012
|align=center|February 25 – March 10Tallinn
| "Puhastusimport":Martin Lill, Ingar Mäesalu, Jan Anderson, Karl Kukner, alternate: Siim Sildnik
| "Bullseye":Mihhail Vlassov, Janis Kiziridi, Vladimir Jakovlev, Eduard Veltsman, alternate: Jevgeni Aksenovski, Eduard Jakovlev
| "Hansa Sport":Leo Jakobson, Andres Jakobson, Sven Petermann, Toomas Lill, alternate: Indrek Ernits
|-
|align=center|2013
|align=center|March 2–17Tallinn
| "Puhastusimport":Martin Lill, Ingar Mäesalu, Siim Sildnik, Jan Anderson
| "Jeti":Harri Lill, Robert-Kent Päll, Georgi Komarov, Fred Randver
| "Arenaria":Erkki Lill, Vladimir Jakovlev, Jaanus Lindre, Toomas Lill, alternate: Indrek Ernits, Karl Kukner
|-
|align=center|2014
|align=center|March 8–23Tallinn
| "Puhastusimport":Martin Lill, Harri Lill, Siim Sildnik, Fred Randver, alternates: Ingar Mäesalu, Jan Anderson
| "Bullseye":Vladimir Jakovlev, Mihhail Vlassov, Janis Kiziridi, Konstantin Dotsenko, alternate: Erkki Lill
| "Rolling Stones"Andres Jakobson, Karl Kukner, Aleksandr Vaganov, Sven Petermann, alternates: Leo Jakobson, Margus Tubalkain
|-
|align=center|2015
|align=center|January 30 –February 8Tallinn
| "Puhastusimport":Martin Lill, Ingar Mäesalu, Andres Jakobson, Jan Anderson, alternates: Tanel Toomväli, Johan Karlson
| "220 Energia":Karl Kukner, Eiko-Siim Peips, Konstantin Dotsenko, Erkki Lill, alternates: Vladimir Jakovlev, Martin Leedo
| "Jeti"Sander Rõuk, Siim Sildnik, Robert-Kent Päll, Harri Lill, alternates: Fred Randver, Arne Karl Sternfeld
|-
|align=center|2016
|align=center|January 29 –February 7Tallinn
| "Puhastusimport":Martin Lill, Ingar Mäesalu, Johan Karlson, Tanel Toomväli, alternate: Jan Anderson
| "Jeti"Harri Lill, Siim Sildnik, Sander Rõuk, Arne Karl Sternfeld, coach: Brian Gray 
| "Energia 220":Erkki Lill, Karl Kukner, Ronald Andla, Konstantin Dontsenko, alternate: Chris Roosaar, coach: Sulev Lokk|-
|align=center|2017
|align=center|January 28 –February 5Tallinn2017 Estonian Men's Curling Championship - Curlingzone
| "CC Tallinn"Harri Lill, Siim Sildnik, Sten Andreas Ehrlich, Kaarel Holm
| "Puhastusimport":Martin Lill, Tanel Toomväli, Jan Anderson, Tarmo Vahesoo
| "Team Jakovlev":Mihhail Vlassov, Janis Kiziridi, Vladimir Jakovlev, Eduard Jakovlev
|-
|align=center|2018
|align=center|January 25–28Tallinn2018 Estonian Men's Curling Championship - Curlingzone
| "CC Tallinn"Harri Lill, Siim Sildnik, Sten Andreas Ehrlich, Kaarel Holm
| "Cutform":Mihhail Vlassov, Eduard Veltsman, Andres Jakobson, Janis Kiziridi
| "CC Arenaria":Erkki Lill, Tarmo Vahesoo, Jan Anderson, Jarl Guštšin
|-
|align=center|2019
|align=center|May 9–12Tallinn
| "Team Lill"Harri Lill, Karl Kukner, Tanel Toomväli, Tarvin Kaldvee, alternate: Arne Karl Sternfeld, coach: Kristian Lindström| "Team Veltsman":Eduard Veltsman, Andres Jakobson, Janis Kiziridi, Igor Dzenzeljuk, alternate: Mihhail Vlassov, coach: Vladimir Jakovlev| "Team Vähesoo":Tarmo Vähesoo, Olari Kalvik, Valvo Vooremaa, Siim Sein, alternate: Erkki Lill
|-
|align=center|2020
|align=center|January 30 – February 1Tallinn2020 Estonian Men's Curling Championship - Curlingzone (NO results as of Mar 8, 2020)
| "Team Veltsman":Eduard Veltsman, Mihhail Vlassov, Janis Kiziridi, Igor Dzenzeljuk, alternate: Erkki Lill, coach: Vladimir Jakovlev| "Team Jakobson":Andres Jakobson, Harri Lill, Tanel Toomväli, Karl Kukner, alternate: Ingar Mäesalu
| "Team Kalvik":Olari Kalvik, Siim Sein, Valvo Vooremaa, Aleksander Andre, alternate: Margus Tubalkain
|-
|align=center|2021
|align=center|January 28–31Tallinn
| "Team Veltsman":Eduard Veltsman, Mihhail Vlassov, Janis Kiziridi, Igor Dzenzeljuk, alternate: Erkki Lill, coach: Vladimir Jakovlev| "Team Vähesoo":Tarmo Vähesoo, Olari Kalvik, Siim Sein, Aleksander Andre, alternate: Andres Jakobson, coach: Margus Tubalkain| "Team Lill":Harri Lill, Tanel Toomväli, Karl Kukner, Tarvin Kaldvee
|-
|align=center|2022
|align=center|April 7–10Tallinn
| "Team Veltsman":Mihhail Vlassov, Eduard Veltsman, Janis Kiziridi, Igor Dzenzeljuk, alternate: Konstantin Dotsenko
| "Team Jakobson":Andres Jakobson, Siim Sein, Olari Kalvik, Aleksander Andre
| "Team Holm":Kaarel Holm, Karl Kukner, Tanel Toomväli, Tarvin Kaldvee
|-
|align=center|2023
|align=center|January 12–15Tallinn
| "Team Veltsman":Mihhail Vlassov, Eduard Veltsman, Janis Kiziridi, Igor Dzenzeljuk, alternate: Konstantin Dotsenko
| "Team Holm":Kaarel Holm, Karl Kukner, Tanel Toomväli, Tarvin Kaldvee
| "Team Jakobson":Andres Jakobson, Siim Sein, Olari Kalvik, Aleksander Andre

|}

Medal record for skips(as of 2022; placement for skips only)''

See also
Estonian Women's Curling Championship
Estonian Mixed Curling Championship
Estonian Mixed Doubles Curling Championship

References

Curling competitions in Estonia
Recurring sporting events established in 2005
2005 establishments in Estonia
National curling championships
National championships in Estonia